Macandrevia is a genus of brachiopods belonging to the family Zeilleriidae.

The genus has cosmopolitan distribution.

Species:

Macandrevia africana 
Macandrevia americana 
Macandrevia bayeri 
Macandrevia cooperi 
Macandrevia cranium 
Macandrevia delicatula 
Macandrevia diamantina 
Macandrevia emigi 
Macandrevia nipponica 
Macandrevia tenera

References

Brachiopod genera